The National Basketball League Rebounding Champion is an annual National Basketball League (NBL) award given since the league's inaugural season to the player with the highest rebounds per game average of the regular season. The winner receives the Garry Pettis Memorial Trophy, which is named in honour of Pettis, a former New Zealand player and coach who is most notable for guiding the Canterbury Rams to the 1986 championship as head coach.

Winners 

|}

See also
 List of National Basketball League (New Zealand) awards

Notes

References

Awards established in 1982
Rebound
R
1982 establishments in New Zealand